The 2007–08 North Texas Mean Green men's basketball team (often referred to as "North Texas" or the "Mean Green") represents the University of North Texas in the 2007–08 college basketball season. The team is led by head coach Johnny Jones. In 2006–07, North Texas set a new school-record with 23 wins, also the Mean Green won its first Sun Belt Conference title and advanced for only the second time to the NCAA Division I men's basketball tournament. The Mean Green play their home games on campus at the Super Pit in Denton, Texas.

Preseason

Recruiting

Schedule

|-
!colspan=9| Exhibition

|-
!colspan=9| Regular season

|-
!colspan=9| 2008 Sun Belt Conference men's basketball tournament

References

North Texas Mean Green men's basketball seasons
North Texas
North Texas Mean Green men's basketball team
North Texas Mean Green men's basketball team